Twenty Days Without War is a 1976 Soviet film based on a story by Konstantin Simonov, directed by Aleksey German and starring Yuri Nikulin and Lyudmila Gurchenko.

The film describes how the romantic views of war as pictured in the Soviet war film industry were actually far different from the harsh realities of front line warfare.

Plot
Major Lopatin (played by actor Yuri Nikulin) is a military journalist during World War II, who goes back to his hometown of Tashkent (Uzbekistan) in Middle Asia at the end of 1942 to spend a 20-day leave following the Battle of Stalingrad and to see the shooting of a film based on his wartime articles he has written. There he is romantically involved with a woman named Nina (played by Ludmila Gurchenko).

Lopatin realizes that the romanticized views of warfare on the home front are vastly different from the realities he had encountered.

Production
The film was based on the novel and screenplay of Konstantin Simonov (1915-1979), a military journalist who wrote the famous poem "Wait for me" during World War II in 1941.

The film was mostly shot in black and white, or very muted color, as looking aged to be visually closed to that wartime.

Cast
Yuri Nikulin as Major Vasily Nikolaevich Lopatin, military journalist
Lyudmila Gurchenko as Nina
Rashid Sadykov as Usman Yusupov, secretary of the Central Committee
Alexei Petrenko as Yuri Stroganov, pilot Captain
Angelina Stepanova as Zinaida Antonovna, artistic director of the theater
Mikhail Kononov as Pasha Rubtsov, voenkor
Yekaterina Vasilyeva as Rubtsov, widow of Pasha
Nikolai Grinko as Vyacheslav (voiced by Innokenty Smoktunovsky)
Lyusyena Ovchinnikova as Ksenia Sergeevna, former wife of Lopatin
Liya Akhedzhakova as woman with clocks
Dmitry Bessonov as Vedeneev, Ksenia's new husband
Zoya Vinogradova as Vera, actress
Lyudmila Zaytseva as Lidiya, actress playing a female sniper
Vladimir Mishanin as soldier on the train
Nikolay Mikheev as Colonel, film consultant (voiced by Igor Efimov)
Yuri Soloviev as commander
Vera Karpova as stepmother Nina (uncredited)
Oleg Korchikov as the driver (uncredited)
Arkady Trusov as guest-singer (uncredited)

References

External links
 

1976 films
1976 drama films
Soviet drama films
Russian drama films
1970s Russian-language films
Lenfilm films
Eastern Front of World War II films
Films set in 1942
Films directed by Aleksei Yuryevich German